Pranav Singh (born 6 April 1966). He is a Member of the Legislative assembly of the Uttarakhand Legislative Assembly in India. He is elected for the fourth consecutive time and is one of the senior Members of the Uttarakhand Legislative Assembly. He has also served as a cabinet-rank official in the previous state governments under the Chief-Ministership of N. D. Tiwari, Vijay Bahuguna & Harish Rawat.

Career 
Singh contested from Khanpur at the 2012 legislative assembly election as a candidate of the Indian National Congress (INC). In May 2016, along with eight other legislators, he revolted against the Harish Rawat-led INC government in the State. Around this time, he quit the INC and joined the BJP. He was disqualified as a legislator under the anti-defection law only to be elected from the BJP after the 2017 election. He was suspended for 3 months from Bharatiya Janata Party on 23, June 2019, following his feud with another lawmaker Deshraj Karanwal. 
On 11 July 2019, Bharatiya Janata Party  extended the suspension of Pranav Singh Champion for an indefinite period because he appeared in a controversial video which showed him dancing with guns and comparing the size of the state he represents to his genitals. The video went viral on social media, causing embarrassment to the party.His wife fought election in 2021  came 3rd against independent candidate.

References 

People from Dehradun district
Bharatiya Janata Party politicians from Uttarakhand
Living people
Uttarakhand MLAs 2002–2007
Uttarakhand MLAs 2007–2012
Uttarakhand MLAs 2012–2017
Uttarakhand MLAs 2017–2022
1966 births